Green Township is the name of some places in the U.S. state of Pennsylvania:
Green Township, Forest County, Pennsylvania
Green Township, Indiana County, Pennsylvania

See also
Greene Township, Pennsylvania (disambiguation)
Greenfield Township, Pennsylvania (disambiguation)
Greenville Township, Pennsylvania
Greenwich Township, Pennsylvania
Greenwood Township, Pennsylvania (disambiguation)

Pennsylvania township disambiguation pages